is an Okinawan stir fry dish. It is considered the representative dish of Okinawan cuisine. Chanpurū generally consists of tofu combined with some kind of vegetable, meat, or fish. Luncheon meat (such as American Spam or Danish Tulip), egg, moyashi (bean sprouts) and gōyā (bitter melon) are some other common ingredients. Spam is not typically used in mainland Japan; but it is more common in Okinawa due primarily to the historical influence of its introduction by the US Navy. Chanpurū is Okinawan for "something mixed" and the word is sometimes used to refer to the culture of Okinawa, as it can be seen as a mixture of traditional Okinawan, Chinese, mainland Japanese, Southeast Asian and North American culture. The term originates from the Malay and Indonesian word campur (pronounced "cham-poor"), meaning "mix".

Long a local specialty only found on Okinawa, chanpurū has in recent years, through television shows and increased interest in Okinawan culture, spread to many restaurants on mainland Japan.

Types of chanpurū
Gōyā chanpurū is the quintessential chanpurū. It consists of gōyā (bitter melon), egg, tofu, and either Spam or thinly sliced pork. It often also includes vegetables such as carrots.

Tofu chanpurū is tofu stir-fried with vegetables and Spam, bacon, thinly sliced pork belly, or canned tuna. Unlike tofu from mainland Japan, Okinawan tofu is firm and does not fall apart when stir-fried. It is considered best form to crumble the tofu into the frying pan by hand, so as to avoid uniform cubes.

Māmina chanpurū is a version of chanpurū that contains moyashi, or mung bean sprouts.

Fu chanpurū is made using fu, a kind of wheat gluten. It is stir-fried with vegetables and a meat as above.

Sōmen chanpurū (somin chanpurū in Okinawan) includes sōmen, very thin noodles. They are stir-fried lightly in oil with green onions and meat as above.

See also

 Champloose
 List of tofu dishes

References

Japanese fusion cuisine
Okinawan cuisine
Pork dishes
Spam dishes
Tofu dishes